Justice Winslow may refer to:

John B. Winslow (1851–1920), associate justice of the Wisconsin Supreme Court
Walter C. Winslow (1882–1962), temporary associate justice of the Oregon Supreme Court

See also
Justise Winslow (born 1996), American professional basketball player